Hotel Capital is a historic hotel building in Lincoln, Nebraska. It was built by H. L. Stevens & Co. in 1925–1926, and designed in the Georgian Revival style, with "quoins, diminutive blind balustrade sections, Ionic pi 1 asters 9 classical window surrounds, panels, stringcourses, and stone urns." It has been listed on the National Register of Historic Places since December 5, 1983.

References

National Register of Historic Places in Lancaster County, Nebraska
Georgian Revival architecture in Nebraska
Hotel buildings completed in 1926
1925 establishments in Nebraska